Hirebudihal is a village in Dharwad district of Karnataka, India.

Demographics 
As of the 2011 Census of India there were 284 households in Hirebudihal and a total population of 1,611 consisting of 816 males and 795 females. There were 212 children ages 0-6.

References

Villages in Dharwad district